"L.A. Woman" is a song by the American rock band the Doors. The song is the title track of their 1971 album L.A. Woman, the final album to feature Jim Morrison before his death on July 3, 1971.
LA Weekly named it  on their list of  "the 20 best songs about the city of Los Angeles".

In 1985, fourteen years after Morrison's death, Ray Manzarek directed, and Rick Schmidlin produced a music video for the song. It was aired on MTV and included in the Doors film Dance on Fire.

Band guitarist Robby Krieger has numerous times cited "L.A. Woman" as the "quintessential Doors song". It was labelled the 40th best classic-rock song by the New York radio station Q104,3.

Lyrics
"L.A. Woman" has been viewed as Morrison's "final goodbye" to Los Angeles, before his transportation to Paris, France. The song's lyrics draw inspiration from John Rechy's transgressive novel City of Night, published in 1963, while its title is expressed as a metaphor, personifying L.A. (Los Angeles) as a woman. In author Melissa Ursula Dawn Goldsmith's description, it is also used to describe the city's topography and atmosphere.

In the bridge, Morrison repeats the phrase "Mr. Mojo Risin'," which is an anagram of his name "Jim Morrison". Doors drummer John Densmore later explained the story of the line:
 

A yellow sheet of lined A4 paper with the lyrics of the track, handwritten by Morrison, was auctioned in Berkshire, UK for £13,000 on August 4, 2009.

Personnel
The Doors
Jim Morrisonvocals
Ray ManzarekWurlitzer piano, Fender Rhodes piano
Robby Kriegerlead guitar
John Densmoredrums

Additional musicians
Jerry Scheffbass guitar 
Marc Bennorhythm guitar

Billy Idol version

English singer Billy Idol recorded a version of "L.A. Woman" for his fourth studio album Charmed Life (1990). As the album's second single, Idol's version reached number 52 on the Billboard Hot 100 in October 1990. The song's music video was directed by David Fincher and received heavy rotation on MTV.

The Doors and Jim Morrison were an influence on Idol during his early years in the music industry. In a 1990 interview with the Associated Press, Idol commented on his interpretation of the song in comparison to the Doors' original, "Jim Morrison was singing about America or L.A. as a microcosm of an America he was very jaded with, really, to the extent that he left it go to Europe, whereas I'm the other way around. I'm still having a bit of a love affair with America and so it's exciting to be the 'lost angel'."

Charts

References

External links

Songs written by John Densmore
Songs written by Robby Krieger
Songs written by Ray Manzarek
Songs written by Jim Morrison
1971 songs
1990 singles
The Doors songs
Billy Idol songs
Songs about Los Angeles
Song recordings produced by Bruce Botnick